Archbold Local School District is a school district in Northwest Ohio. The school district serves students who live in the villages of Archbold, Elmira, and Ridgeville Corners located in Fulton County. The superintendent is Jason Selgo.

Grades 9-12
Archbold High School

Grades 5-8
Archbold Middle School

Grades K-4
Archbold Elementary

External links
District Website

School districts in Ohio
Education in Fulton County, Ohio